A Woman of Today is a 1954 West German drama film directed by Paul Verhoeven and starring Luise Ullrich, Curd Jürgens and Carsta Löck.

It was shot at the Bavaria Studios in Munich with location footage at the Brenner Pass and around Florence in Italy. The film's sets were designed by the art directors Franz Bi and Bruno Monden.

Cast
 Luise Ullrich as Toni Bender
 Curd Jürgens as Heinz Bender
 Carsta Löck as Ida
 Marianne Brauns as Marie-Claire
 Robert Freitag as Aldo Mattei
 Annie Rosar as Frau Publik
 Heini Göbel as Hugo Beierle
 Otto Brüggemann
 Michl Lang
 Lis Van Essen

References

Bibliography
 Daniela Berghahn. Hollywood Behind the Wall: The Cinema of East Germany. Manchester University Press, 2005.

External links 
 

1954 films
1954 drama films
German drama films
West German films
1950s German-language films
Films directed by Paul Verhoeven (Germany)
Films shot at Bavaria Studios
German black-and-white films
1950s German films